David Moore Anderson MHK (born 6 February 1954) is a former Member of the House of Keys for Glenfaba. He also served in a number of ministerial posts on the Isle of Man and is therefore a former member of the Council of Ministers.

Political career 
Anderson was elected as a Member of the House of Keys in 2001 for Glenfaba. He was re-elected in 2006 and 2011. He had previously served as a Commissioner for the parish of Patrick from 1992 until his election to the House of Keys.

He was elected to the Legislative Council in 2015, for what was intended to be a five-year term, but he announced his early retirement in 2018.

He was called to resign by protesters following his support of legislation which would have prohibited the advocacy of homosexuality in schools.

Ministerial positions 
Anderson served in several ministerial posts while a member of the House of Keys:
Minister for Education, 2004–06
Minister for Transport, 2006–10
Minister for Health, 2010–14

Personal life
Anderson is the son of former President of the Legislative Council Ian Anderson.

He received his secondary education at the Douglas High School for Boys. He later moved to Cumbria, where he studied at Newton Rigg Agricultural College.

He has been married to Jane (née Williams) since 1982; they have 2 grown up children together. He also has worked as a dairy and mixed farmer.
He also served as the Vice-President of the Manx Farmers Union from 1999 until 2001.

He is a keen athlete, having competed in the Commonwealth Games in 1978. He was recently World Champion for Under 50s at 400m hurdles, and continues to race.

References

Living people
1954 births
Athletes (track and field) at the 1978 Commonwealth Games
Members of the House of Keys 2001–2006
Members of the House of Keys 2006–2011
Members of the House of Keys 2011–2016
British sportsperson-politicians
Commonwealth Games competitors for the Isle of Man